The 1880 United States presidential election in Nevada took place on November 2, 1880, as part of the 1880 United States presidential election. State voters chose three representatives, or electors, to the Electoral College, who voted for president and vice president.

Nevada was won by General Winfield Scott Hancock (D–Pennsylvania), running with former Representative William Hayden English, with 52.40% of the popular vote, against Representative James A. Garfield (R-Ohio), running with the 10th chairman of the New York State Republican Executive Committee Chester A. Arthur, with 47.60% of the vote. This was the first time Nevada voted for a Democratic presidential candidate, with Hancock's victory being generally attributed to the fact that Garfield was viewed as weaker than Hancock on the hot-bed issue of controlling immigration from China – which both major parties promised to do and which the Nevada electorate was overwhelmingly in favor of.

Results

Results by county

See also
United States presidential elections in Nevada

References

Nevada
1880
1880 Nevada elections